Fernando Afonso de Albuquerque (1327-1387) was a Portuguese nobleman, alcaide da Guarda, and Ambassador of England.

Biography 

Born in Portugal. Fernando was the son of João Afonso de Albuquerque, 6th Lord of Albuquerque and Maria Rodrigues Barba. His grandparents were Afonso Sanches and Teresa Martínez de Meneses. Fernando Alonso was never married, but formed couples with Laura a lady born in England, with whom he had several children. Her daughter Joana Albuquerque, was member of the court of Philippa of Lancaster.

References 

1327 births
1387 deaths
Medieval Portuguese nobility
Portuguese military personnel
14th-century Portuguese people